This Pen Is a Weapon is the second album by Chicago-based punk rock band The Ghost. It was released June 1, 2004, on Some Records.

Track listing

References 

2004 albums
The Ghost (American band) albums